1991 Football Championship of Ukrainian SSR was the last season of association football competition of the Ukrainian SSR, which was part of the Soviet Lower Second League. The competition was won for the first time by FC Naftovyk Okhtyrka.

Teams

Map

Promoted teams 
 Avtomobilist Sumy – Champion of the Fitness clubs competitions (KFK) finals, Zone 3 winner (debut)
 Mayak Ochakiv – Runner-up of the Fitness clubs competitions (KFK) finals, Zone 5 winner (debut)
 Stal Komunarsk – Participant of the Fitness clubs competitions (KFK) finals, Zone 4 winner (debut)
 Temp Shepetivka – Participant of the Fitness clubs competitions (KFK) finals, Zone 2 winner (debut)
 Vahonobudivnyk Stakhanov – Participant of the Fitness clubs competitions (KFK) finals, Zone 6 winner (debut)
 Karpaty Kamianka-Buzka – Participant of the Fitness clubs competitions (KFK) finals, Zone 1 winner (debut)
 Pryladyst Mukacheve – Runner-up of the Fitness clubs competitions (KFK), Zone 2 (returning to professional level after an absence of 21 seasons)
 Khimik Severodonetsk – Fourth-placed team of the Fitness clubs competitions (KFK) finals, Zone 4 (returning to professional level after an absence of 21 seasons)

Relegated teams 
 Zakarpattia Uzhhorod – 20th place

Renamed teams 

Prior to the start of the season Avanhard Rivne was renamed to Veres Rivne.

Final standings

Top goalscorers 

The following were the top ten goalscorers.

External links 
 1991 Second League, Zone 1. Zorya Luhansk website.
 1991 Soviet Championship
 1991 Soviet Championship at rsssf.com

1991
4
4
Football Championship of the Ukrainian SSR